William John Challee (April 6, 1904 – March 11, 1989) was an American actor.

Biography

Challee was born in Chicago and was a student at Lake View High School. 

Challee appeared on Broadway by 1926 and by 1931 in early Group Theatre productions. He married actress Ruth Nelson on August 2, 1931; they divorced on August 13, 1937. The two appeared in the 1947 film The Sea of Grass, in supporting roles, after they were divorced.

In 1937 Challee staged a suite of one-act plays at the Lafayette Theatre in Harlem, under the heading Plays of the Sea. The suite consisted of the Eugene O'Neill plays Bound East for Cardiff, In the Zone, The Long Voyage Home and Moon of the Caribbees. They were produced by the Federal Theatre Project of the WPA, running for 68 performances from October 29, 1937.

Challee was living in Chicago by 1940. By the middle 1940s, Challee was working in films in California, mainly in supporting and uncredited roles. Challee married dancer Ella Franklin Crawford on April 19, 1944 in Santa Monica. 

Challee appeared in episodes of numerous television series, including a 1953 episode ("Stage for Mademoiselle") of The Lone Ranger and a 1957 episode ("The Case of the Runaway Corpse") of Perry Mason. In 1960 Challee appeared as Saunders on Laramie in the episode titled "Duel at Parkinson Town."  In 1961 he appeared as Eli in the series finale of The Investigators, "The Dead End Man.", as well as the 1961 S3E27 episode "Meeting at the Mimbres" in the western series Bat Masterson.

In 1962 Challee appeared (uncredited) as a prisoner on the TV western The Virginian in the episode titled "The Brazen Bell."
That same year he appeared on Gunsmokeas “Feist”, a crazed pioneer who lost his faculties and tries to kill Marshall Dillon in the episode “The Gallows” (S7E22). Challee played the incapacitated family patriarch in the 1970 film Five Easy Pieces, whose illness brings his son (Jack Nicholson) home to the family estate.

In 1984 he married his long-time partner Joan Wheeler Ankrum.  Together, in 1960, they opened the Ankrum Gallery on La Cienega Boulevard in Los Angeles.

Challee was buried in Alta Mesa Memorial Park in Palo Alto.

Broadway roles

 Grand Street Follies [1927] (1927) (revue)
 Red Rust (1929) as Lenov
 House of Connelly (1931) as Jody and as a Serenader
 Night Over Taos (1932) as second trapper
 Success Story (1932) as Jeffery Haliburton
 Men in White (1933) as Dr. Michaelson
 Gold Eagle Guy (1934) as Pearly and as Ah Kee
 Till the Day I Die (1935) as Edsel Peltz
 Waiting For Lefty (1935) as Actor
 Key Largo (1935) as Osceola Horn
 Paradise Lost (1935) as homeless man
 Case of Clyde Griffiths (1936) as working man
 Johnny Johnson (1936) as  Private Fairfax and as Doctor
 Rocket to the Moon (1938) as a salesman
 Awake and Sing! (1939) as Schlosser

Selected filmography

 ...One Third of a Nation... (1939) as Reporter (uncredited)
 Destination Tokyo (1943) as  Rocky the quartermaster (uncredited)  
 The Story of Dr. Wassell (1944) as Radio Man (uncredited)
 Days of Glory (1944) as Ducrenko (uncredited)
 The Seventh Cross (1944) as Fischer (uncredited)
 None but the Lonely Heart (1944) as Knocker Jones (uncredited)
 A Song to Remember (1945) as Titus (uncredited)
 God Is My Co-Pilot (1945) as Joe (uncredited)  
 Counter-Attack (1945) as Paratrooper (uncredited)
 Miss Susie Slagle's (1946) as Interne (uncredited)
 Tokyo Rose (1946) as Mike Kovac
 Deadline at Dawn (1946) as Ray – Newsstand Proprietor (uncredited)
 From This Day Forward (1946) as Pawnbroker (uncredited)
 Without Reservations (1946) as Corporal (uncredited)
 Swamp Fire (1946) as barfly (uncredited)
 Nocturne (1946) as police photographer Olsen (uncredited)
 Boomerang (1947) as Whitney – Harvey's Assistant (uncredited)
 The Sea of Grass (1947) as deputy sheriff (uncredited)
 The Guilt of Janet Ames (1947) as Ambulance Surgeon (uncredited)
 Desperate (1947) as Reynolds
 Another Part of the Forest (1948) as Passenger on the Train (uncredited)
 Tap Roots (1948) as Sergeant (uncredited)
 Beyond Glory (1948) as Sergeant at Depot (uncredited)
 Force of Evil (1948) as Gunman #1 (uncredited)
 Reign of Terror (1949) as Bourdon (uncredited)
 Port of New York (1949) as Leo Stasser
 Outrage (1950) as Lee Wilkins
 Gambling House (1950) as Parking Attendant (uncredited)
 The Whip Hand (1951) as Guard (uncredited)
 On Dangerous Ground (1951) as thug (uncredited)
 The Big Trees (1952) as Brother Williams (uncredited)
 This Woman Is Dangerous (1952) as Ned Shaw (uncredited)
 The Glenn Miller Story (1954) as dispatch desk Sergeant (uncredited)
 Man Without a Star (1955) as Brick Gooder (uncredited)
 The Lone Ranger (1955, TV Series) as Bad-Eye
 Chicago Syndicate (1955) as Dolan
 The Desperados Are in Town (1956) as Tom Kesh
 Calypso Heat Wave (1957) as Second Thug
 Raintree County (1957) as spectator (uncredited)
 Official Detective (1957, TV Series) as Hatch
 Saddle the Wind (1958) as barfly (uncredited)
 Twilight for the Gods (1958) as Sweeney
 The Sound and the Fury (1959) as roustabout (uncredited) 
 The Story on Page One (1959) as Lemke (uncredited)
 Toby Tyler (1960) as Jailbird (uncredited)
 Noose for a Gunman (1960) as Gorse
 One Foot in Hell (1960) as Pete's Friend (uncredited)
 The Plunderers (1960) as first citizen
 Cimarron (1960) as barber (uncredited)
 All Fall Down (1962) as third bum (uncredited)
 War Hunt (1962) as Lt. Colonel
 "The Alfred Hitchcock Hour episode "The Star Juror" (1963)
 The Hook (1963) as Schmidt  
 Seven Days in May (1964) as General Riley (uncredited)
 Nightmare in the Sun (1965) as old coot in a bar
 Joy in the Morning (1965) as an old derelict (uncredited)
 The Cincinnati Kid (1965) as an old man (uncredited)
 Billy the Kid Versus Dracula (1966) as Tom – Station Agent
 Five Easy Pieces (1970) as Nicholas Dupea
 Zachariah (1971) as "The Old Man" 
 The Great Northfield Minnesota Raid (1972) as oldtimer (uncredited)
 Irish Whiskey Rebellion (1972) as Timothy
 Moonchild (1974) as Alchemist  
 From Noon till Three'' (1976) as piano player (uncredited) (final film role)

References

Sources
Los Angeles Times obituary – William Challee
New York Times obituary – Ruth Nelson 
Answers.com -William Challee

External links
 
 

1904 births
1989 deaths
20th-century American male actors
American male film actors
American male stage actors
Male actors from Illinois
Federal Theatre Project people